The Ebita, also known as Shoshka or Chaushka in the upper reaches, is a river in Kazakhstan, a tributary of the Ural.

The Ebita Nature Reserve, a  steppe and forest-steppe protected area, is located by the banks of the river.

Course
Its sources are located in the southern spurs of the Ural Mountains. It flows roughly northwards, close to the Kazakhstan–Russia border, southwest of Novotroitsk. Finally it joins the left bank of the Ural  from its mouth.

See also
List of rivers of Kazakhstan

References

External links 

В Актюбинской области создадут государственный природный заказник «Эбита» - Kazinform
Volchiy Waterfall (Wolf Waterfall)
Немой аул
Волчий водопад, Немой аул и пруд с осетрами

Rivers of Kazakhstan
Geography of Aktobe Region
Ural basin